Asadollah Kandi (also Romanized as Asadollāh Kandī; also known as ʿAntar Kandī-ye ‘Olyā) is a village in Chaldoran-e Shomali Rural District, in the Central District of Chaldoran County, West Azerbaijan Province, Iran. At the 2006 census, its population was 39, in 9 families.

References 

Populated places in Chaldoran County